The 1993 European Fencing Championships were held in Vienna, Austria. The competition consisted of individual events only.

Medal summary

Men's events

Women's events

Medal table

References 
 Results at the European Fencing Confederation

1993
European Fencing Championships
European Fencing Championships
International fencing competitions hosted by Austria